Pier Cristoforo Giulianotti (born July 6, 1953 in Filattiera) is an Italian surgeon. He is a Professor of Surgery and Chief of The Division of General, Minimally Invasive, and Robotic Surgery at the University of Illinois at Chicago. As of 2020 he has performed about 3,000 robotic-assisted surgeries and trained about 2,000 surgeons to perform the same.

Early life and education 
He received his medical degree from among the foremost Italian universities, “Normale” of Pisa and the University of Milan.  Besides a formal General Surgery Residency, he has completed two additional Residencies in Thoracic Surgery and Vascular Surgery. During the mid-1980s he became an expert in laparoscopic surgery.

Career 
Between 1998 and 2004, he became the Head of the Department of General Surgery at Misericordia Hospital in Grosseto. Already experienced in laparoscopic and advanced open surgery, he took the challenge with the introduction of the new robotic technology in 2000.  In the last eight years he has developed the largest program worldwide for robotic surgery. He has performed over 2100 minimally invasive surgeries of which more than 914 have been robotic procedures. Dr. Giulianotti was the first in the world to perform over a dozen robotic surgical procedures such as formal hepatic resection, lung resection and pancreatico-duodenectomy. Dr. Giulianotti is currently considered the foremost robotic surgeon worldwide.

In April 2008, Dr. Giulianotti and his team at The University of Illinois Medical Center at Chicago have inaugurated the Advanced Robotic Research and Training Laboratory, the only training center in the Midwest designed for robotic training.

Dr. Giulianotti is a founding member and was named the inaugural president of the Clinical robotic surgery association in 2009,

References

External links

Italian surgeons
Living people
University of Illinois Chicago faculty
1953 births